Cow Run is a stream located entirely within Washington County, Ohio. It is a tributary of the Little Muskingum River.

Cow Run was so named on account of the local cows which frequented a salt lick there.

See also
List of rivers of Ohio

References

Rivers of Washington County, Ohio
Rivers of Ohio